The Indonesian Unity Party, Perindo (Partai Perindo) is a political party in Indonesia. The party was founded on 7 February 2015 by media tycoon Hary Tanoesoedibjo, owner of the MNC Group and business partner of former US President Donald Trump.

Background 
Hary Tanoesoedibjo established Perindo Party following his disappointing forays into politics with two other parties. In 2011, he joined the Nasdem Party (Partai Nasional Demokrat) of fellow media baron Surya Paloh, but he quit the party in January 2013 after a falling out with Paloh. In February 2013, he announced he would launch a mass organization called Perindo (United Indonesia), which he hoped would eventually become a political party. In mid-2013 he joined the People's Conscience Party (Hati Nurani Rakyat, Hanura), which nominated him as the running mate of former military commander Wiranto for the 2014 presidential election, but the party was unable to field candidates after a poor showing in the 2014 general election. Hary left Hanura because he disagreed with its decision to support Joko Widodo in the 2014 presidential election. He subsequently transformed Perindo into a full political party, launched at Jakarta International Expo convention center in Kemayoran, Jakarta on 7 February 2015.

Hary has stated he may consider running for the Indonesian presidency in 2019. Under Indonesia's election rules, he will need to be nominated by a party or coalition that controls at least 20% of seats in parliament or won 25% of the popular vote in the previous general election. Perindo has said it may consider filing for a judicial review if the People's Representative Council insists on maintaining this threshold.

In 2017 Hary was investigated for intimidation after allegedly sending tax investigators looking into his company's tax returns an SMS announcing that he would "cleanse" the country of undemocratic law enforcers once he had become Indonesia's leader.

Political alliances
Perindo was allied with former general Prabowo Subianto's Great Indonesia Movement Party (Gerindra), which is part of the Red and White Coalition (KMP) that stands in opposition to President Joko Widodo. Hary in 2015 declared that Perindo and KMP share the same ideology "to fight for the people".

In 2017, Perindo declared its support for Anies Baswedan and Sandiaga Uno, who were victorious in the 19 April runoff Jakarta gubernatorial election, defeating Basuki Tjahaja Purnama.

However, for the 2019 presidential election, it declared its support for incumbent Joko Widodo.

Party platform
Like other Indonesian secular parties, Perindo espouses values of prosperity and justice for all Indonesian citizens. The party's official vision is to make Indonesia a progressive, united, fair, affluent, prosperous, sovereign, dignified and cultured nation.

Perindo's six-point mission statement is:

1. Realizing a just government, which upholds the values of law in accordance with the 1945 Constitution.

2. Realizing a government free of corruption, collusion and nepotism for an independent and dignified Indonesia.

3. Realizing a sovereign, dignified Indonesia in order to maintain the integrity of the Unitary State of the Republic of Indonesia.

4. Creating a just, affluent and prosperous society based on Pancasila and the 1945 Constitution in the Unitary State of the Republic of Indonesia.

5. Upholding rights, human rights and supremacy of the law in which Pancasila and the 1945 Constitution to realize justice and legal certainty in order to protect the life of the people, nation and state.

6. Encouraging national economic growth that contributes directly to the welfare of Indonesian citizens.

Leadership 
 Chairman: Hary Tanoesoedibjo
 Head of Organization: Syafril Nasution
 Head of Cadres, Members and Witnesses: Armyn Gultom
 Head of Research and Development and IT: Sururi Alfaruq
 Head of Political Affairs: Arya Mahendra Sinulingga
 Head of Education and Culture: Budiyanto Darmastono
 Head of Law and Advocacy: Christophorus Taufik
 Head of Women's Empowerment: Ruth Purnamasari
 Head of Economic and Social Affairs: A. Wishnu Handoyono
 Head of Inter-Agency Relations: Mohammad Yamin Tawary
 Head of Foreign Affairs, Defense and Security: Didi Supriyanto
 Head of Religious Affairs: Abdul Khaliq Ahmad
 Head of Youth Voters and Youth: Anna Luthfie
 Head of Labor and Employment: Wina Armada Sukardi
 Head of Energy and Natural Resources: Carol Daniel Kadang
 Secretary General: Ahmad Rofiq
 Treasurer: Henry Suparman

Election results

Legislative election results

Presidential election results

Note: Bold text suggests the party's member

References 

Conservative parties in Asia
Pancasila political parties
Political parties in Indonesia
Political parties established in 2015